Fiona Caroline Graham is an Australian anthropologist working as a geisha in Japan.

Early life
Graham was born in Melbourne, Australia, and first travelled to Japan aged 15 for a student exchange programme, where she attended high school and lived with her host family.

Academic career
Graham's first degrees, in psychology and teaching, were taken at Keio University. She completed an M.Phil. in 1992 and a D.Phil. 2001 in social anthropology at the University of Oxford, focusing on Japanese corporate culture. She has been a lecturer on geisha studies at Keio and Waseda Universities.

Graham has published three volumes of anthropology.

Inside the Japanese Company (2003) and A Japanese Company in Crisis (2005) are about the large insurance company (given the fictional name "C-Life") that Graham joined upon graduation, and which she later observed, first as a researcher and later as a documentary film maker. The book's main subject is "the uneven erosion of the commitment of [the company's] salary men to an overarching corporate ideology", with Graham concentrating on the cohort who entered the company when she did. The reviewer of both books for the British Journal of Industrial Relations viewed her portrayal favourably, but thought that it "[did] not adequately address wider issues of structure and power relations".

The reviewer for the journal Organization of Inside the Japanese Company was troubled by the uninformativeness about Graham's interviewees and by serious problems with the book's quantitative survey. Nevertheless, he found the book insightful and rewarding.

"C-Life" eventually went under in October 2000, and A Japanese Company in Crisis concentrated on the ways in which individual employees thought and acted in expectation of the hard times ahead. The reviewer again found flaws with the book, but on balance gave it a highly favourable review. The review of the book in Social Science Japan Journal had similar high praise for it.

In Playing at Politics: An Ethnography of the Oxford Union (2005), Graham built on a 2001 documentary (The Oxford Union: Campus of Tradition) that she had made for Japanese television about candidacy for president of the Oxford Union:

The reviewer for the Journal of the Royal Anthropological Institute found the book a "witty examination of British political processes" and "[recommended it] to all would-be politicians and their tutors".

Geisha activities

Graham initially entered the geisha profession with the intention of directing a documentary project for the National Geographic Channel; however, upon completing her training (undertaken as part of the documentary's filming), she was given permission to continue working full-time as a geisha, and formally debuted under the name of "Sayuki" in December 2007, though the Asakusa Geisha Association claims that she did not complete required training.

, the documentary itself remained unfinished.

After working in Asakusa for four years as a geisha, Graham applied for permission to take over the  run by her geisha mother, who was retiring due to ill health; her request was denied on the grounds of her being a foreigner.

In 2011, after being asked to leave the geisha community of Asakusa, Graham left to operate independently (against the Asakusa Geisha Association's regulations), though she continued to work as a geisha within the area, opening a kimono shop in Asakusa in the same year. In 2013, Graham was running an independent  in Yanaka, Tokyo, with four apprentices. She allows tourists to come and watch the young geisha have their lessons.

Graham has travelled internationally to demonstrate the traditional arts employed by geisha, visiting the United Kingdom to perform at the Hyper Japan festival in 2013, Dubai in the same year, and Brazil in 2015. 

When the pandemic hit Japan, Graham added online geisha banquets to their repertoire of events.

Wanaka Gym court case
In December 2010, a New Zealand company owned solely by Graham, The Wanaka Gym Ltd., was fined a total of NZ$64,000 and ordered to pay NZ$9,000 in costs, following a conviction relating to an unsafe building used for tourist accommodation. The building had been declared "dangerous" in June 2008, but continued to house paying residents in the two months after. After the conviction, Graham made a number of unsuccessful appeals, and a final leave to appeal by both Graham and the company was rejected in December 2014 by the Supreme Court of New Zealand.

Books by Graham
 Inside the Japanese Company. London: Routledge, 2003. . Hardback , Adobe eReader , ebook .
 A Japanese Company in Crisis: Ideology, Strategy and Narrative. RoutledgeCurzon Contemporary Japan series, 1. London: RoutledgeCurzon, 2005. . 
 Playing at Politics: An Ethnography of the Oxford Union. Edinburgh: Dunedin Academic Press, 2005.

Notes

References

External links
 
 
 
 
 "Geishas 'millennials'", La Vanguardia, 28 May 2017.

Australian anthropologists
Australian expatriates in Japan
Australian women anthropologists
Geishas
Living people
Alumni of Oriel College, Oxford
Keio University alumni
Year of birth missing (living people)